Paul Louis Amans Dop (Toulouse, 25 February 1876 - Lectoure, 19 August 1954) was a French botanist who worked extensively in Indochina. From 1908 he was associated with the Mascarene botanist Marcel Marie Maurice Dubard, carrying out much taxonomic work under the name of Dubard & Dop.

In 1969, botanist Cornelis Gijsbert Gerrit Jan van Steenis published Pauldopia, a monotypic genus of flowering plants from Indo-China, belonging to the family Bignoniaceae and named in honour of Paul Dop.

Publications
 Flore de la region toulousaine - Cong. Assoc. Franc. Avanc. 39 (Toulouse 1910)
 Étude de quelques types nouveaux ou peu connus de Rubiacées de Madagascar (Extrait du Journal de botanique, t.III, 2e série) - Marcel Dubard, Paul Dop (1911)
 La végétation de l'Indo-Chine - Trav.Lab. For. Toulouse I (Art. 9): 1-16 (1931)
 Les Gmelina arborescents de l'Indochine - Rev. Bot. Appl. 13: 893-897 (1933)
 Manuel de Technique Botanique , Histologie Et Microbie - Paul Dop, Albert Gautié - 1928
 Étude de quelques types nouveaux ou peu connus de - Marcel Dubard, Paul Dop - 1911
 Recherches sur la structure et le développement de la - Paul Dop - 1903
 Un nouveau genre d'Ericacées de l'Annam ; La végétation de - Paul Dop - 1931
 Observations sur la végétation littorale du golfe de Gascogne - Paul Dop - 1931
 Sur deux genres nouveaux de Bignoniacées du Tonkin - Paul Dop - 1929
 Contribution à l'étude des Loganiacées asiatiques de - Paul Dop - 1910
 Les Callicarpa de l'Indochine - Paul Dop - 1932
 Recherches sur la structure et le dévoloppment de la fleur - Paul Dop - 1903
 Flore de la région toulousaine - Paul Dop - 1910
 Les Cléthracées asiatiques - Paul Dop - 1928
 Les Symphorémoldées de l'Indochine - René Dupont, Paul Dop, Université de Toulouse. Laboratoire forestier - 1933
 Description de quelques espèces nouvelles de Madagascar - Marcel Dubard, Paul Dop
 Recherches anatomiques sur la fleur du Tanghin du Ménabé - Paul Dop - 1904
 Contribution a l'étude des Malpighiacées de Madagascar - Marcel Dubard, Paul Dop - 1908
 Les Vitex de l'Indo-Chine - Paul Dop - 1928
 Les Symphorémoidées de l'Indochine - Paul Dop - 1933
 Contribution à l'étude des Bignoniacées - Paul Dop - 1925
 Un Nouveau genre d'éricacées de l'Annam - Paul Dop, Laboratoire forestier (Toulouse) - 1931
 Bignoniacées nouvelles de l'Indo-Chine - Paul Dop - 1926

Eponyms
Pauldopia Steenis 1969 in the family Bignoniaceae
(Ericaceae) Vaccinium dopii H.F.Cope (=Vaccinium dunalianum var. urophyllum Rehder & E.H. Wilson)
(Lamiaceae) Premna dopii C.Pei (=Premna tapintzeana Dop)
(Lamiaceae) Teucrium × dopii Sennen

References

20th-century French botanists